This is a list of newspapers in China. The number of newspapers in mainland China has increased from 42—virtually all Communist Party papers—in 1968 to 382 in 1980 and more than 2,200 today. In 2006, China was the largest market for daily newspapers, with 96.6m copies sold daily, followed by India with 78.7m, Japan with 69.7m, the US with 53.3m, and Germany with 21.5m. China newspaper advertisement revenues increased by 128% from 2001 to 2006.

Between 1950 and 2000, the number of Chinese newspapers increased nearly ten-fold. In 2004, over 400 kinds of daily newspapers were published in China, their circulation reaching 80 million, the highest figure of any country in the world. Targeted at different reader groups, newspaper formats are becoming increasingly diverse. Recent years have seen an important trend of newspaper reorganization. To date, 39 newspaper groups have been established, such as Beijing Daily Newspaper Group, Wenhui Xinmin Associated Newspaper Group and Guangzhou Daily Newspaper Group.

In 2003, trans-regional cooperation among the print media became a new trend. The Beijing News, invested and run by Guangming Daily newspaper group and Nanfang Media Group, was the first to receive formal approval from the Chinese government to publish trans-regionally. Also Orient-Observation Weekly came out in Shanghai, its largest shareholder being the Beijing-based Xinhua News Agency.

History
In 1987 China had three news agencies serving two regimes, the Central News Agency in Taiwan and the Xinhua News Agency along with China News Service (Zhongguo Xinwenshe) in the mainland. Central News Agency is the country’s oldest news agency founded in 1928 in Guangzhou by the Nationalist government led by the Kuomintang which remains in existence in Taiwan. On the mainland, controlled by the Chinese Communist Party (CCP), Xinhua was the major source of news and photographs for central and local newspapers. The CCP's newspapers People's Daily and Enlightenment Daily (or Guangming Daily), and the People's Liberation Army's PLA Daily continued to have the largest circulation.

In addition to these major party and army organs, most professional and scientific organizations published newspapers or journals containing specialized information in fields as varied as astronomy and entomology.

Local morning and evening newspapers concentrating on news and feature stories about local people and events were extremely popular, selling out each day shortly after they arrived at the newsstands. In June 1981 the English-language China Daily began publication. This newspaper, which was provided for foreigners living or traveling in China but which also was read by a large number of Chinese literate in English, offered international news and sports from the major foreign wire services as well as interesting domestic news and feature articles.

Reference News, an official news organ that carried foreign news items in Chinese translation, was available to cadres and their families. In 1980 it enjoyed a circulation of 11 million, but, with the subsequent proliferation of other news sources, its circulation dropped to 4 million in 1985, causing the subscription policy to be changed to make it available to all Chinese. Another source of foreign reporting was Reference Information (Cankao Ziliao), a more restricted Chinese reprint of foreign reportage available only to middle- and upper-level cadres. Both of these publications often included foreign reports critical of China.

List

National newspapers
China Daily - English language national daily
China Economic Daily - daily 
China Education Daily (Zhongguo Jiaoyu Bao)
China News Digest (Hua Xia Wen Zhai) - independent online media run abroad
China Public Security Daily - official public security bureau paper 
China Youth Daily (Zhongguo Qingnian Bao) - quasi-liberal daily; state-run, associated with the Communist Youth League of China
Economic Information Daily 
The Economic Observer - classical liberal weekly; English edition website of the privately owned weekly newspaper 
Global Times - Chinese Communist Party aligned, tabloid with two language editions, - Chinese and English
Gongren Ribao (Workers' Daily)
Guangming Daily - conservative daily, close to the CCP
Legal Daily (Fazhi Ribao) - supervised by the Ministry of Justice
Nongmin Ribao (Farmers' Daily) - agricultural and rural issues
People's Court Daily
People's Daily (Renmin Ribao) - official daily of the CCP Central Committee
PLA Daily (Jiefangjun Bao) - official daily of the People's Liberation Army
Reference News - has the largest circulation in mainland China, published by Xinhua News Agency

Regional newspapers

Anhui
Anhui Daily
Hefei Wanbao

Beijing
Beijing Daily
Beijing Daily Messenger - prints 180,000 to 200,000 — 60,000 for subscribers; of the 120,000 retail copies, at least one-third is unsold 
Beijing Entertainment News
Beijing Evening News - prints 700,000 copies — 450,000 for retail and 250,000 for subscribers; of the retail copies, 50,000 to 100,000 are unsold
Beijing Globe
Beijing Morning News - prints 180,000 — 130,000 are for subscribers; of the 50,000 retail copies, at least 20,000 are sold by the distribution center director as waste paper
The Beijing News (Xin Jing Bao) - third best-selling daily in Beijing; newly launched daily with reformist ambitions, very liberal
Beijing Portal
Beijing Ribao
Beijing Times (Jing Hua Shi Bao) - People's Daily-affiliated tabloid, centrist/liberal, second best-selling tabloid in the capital
Beijing Today - an English weekly covering cultural events and embassy news published by the Beijing Youth Daily 
Beijing Youth Daily - fourth best-selling daily in the capital
China Newsday - an English China news aggregation which covers political, environmental and economic discussion
Freezing Point
Legal Mirror (Fazhi Ribao)
A Liar's Digest - a Beijing-based underground newspaper in mainland China, which pokes fun at the state-controlled media

Chongqing
Chongqing Daily
China High Tech
Chongqing Evening News
Chongqing Globe
Chongqing News - Chinese, English 
Chongqing Today

Fujian
Common Talk
Fujian Ribao

Gansu
Gansu Daily

Guangdong
21st Century Business Herald
Dongguan Times
Guangzhou Daily
Guangzhou Metro Daily
Guangzhou Morning Post
Information Times
Panyu Daily
Shenzhen Daily - one of China's three English-language daily newspapers 
Shenzhen Dushi News
Shenzhen Economic Daily
Shenzhen Evening News
Shenzhen Special Zone Daily
Shenzhen Youth News
Southern Daily
Southern Metropolis Daily
Southern Weekly
Xin Kuai Bao
Yangcheng Evening News
Zhongshan Daily

Guangxi
Guangxi Daily

Guizhou
Guizhou Business Daily
Guizhou Daily
Guizhou Provincial
Huaxi City Daily

Hainan
Haikou Evening News
Hainan Daily
Nanguo Metropolis Daily

Hebei
Hebei Daily  - CCP official paper
 Hebei Youth Daily  - tabloid covering Shijiazhuang, operated by Beijing Youth Daily
 Shijiazhuang Daily  - CCP official paper
 Yanzhao Evening Post  - tabloid covering Shijiazhuang, the capital of Hebei 
Yanzhao Metropolis Daily  - tabloid covering Hebei and sold in 11 cities around Hebei Province

Heilongjiang
Harbin Daily
Heilongjiang Morning Post

Henan
Central Railway News
Dahe Newspaper
Luoyang Daily

Hubei
Chutian Metro Daily
Hubei News
Wuhan Evening News
Wuhan Morning News
Xianning Daily

Hunan
Changsha Evening News  - Chinese, English 
Hunan Daily
Sanxiang Metro News
Xiaoxiang Morning News

Inner Mongolia
Hohhot Evening Post
Hohhot Morning Post
Hulunbeir Daily
Inner Mongolia Daily
Northern News Daily
Northern Family Daily

Jiangsu
Wuxi Daily - Wuxi
Xinhua Daily
Yangtse Evening Post - Nanjing
Yangzhou Ribao
Nanjing Morning Post

JiangxiInformation DailyJiangnan newspaperJiangxi DailyJilinChina JilinJilin NewsToday NewLiaoningDalian DailyDalian Evening NewsLiaoning DailyLiaoning FarmerNorth Morning NewsPeninsula City NewsPeninsula Morning NewsShenyang WanbaoTimes Business DailyShaanxiShaanxi DailySanqin DailyChinese Business ViewXi'an DailyXi'an Evening NewsSunshine DailyTongchuan DailyBaoji DailyXianyang DailyWeinan DailyShandongDazhong DailyJinan DailyJinan Times - dailyLife Daily - published by Shandong Dazhong Daily News GroupQilu Evening News - 1.2 million circulation; published by Shandong Dazhong Daily News GroupQingdao DailyQingdao GlobeQingdao NewsShanghai

ShanxiShanxi DailySichuanChengdu Economic DailySichuan DailyTrust PostTianjinJin WanbaoTianjin RibaoTibetLasa Evening NewsTibet BroadcastTibet DailyXinjiangQapqal News, the world's only Xibe-language newspaperXinjiang DailyXinjiang Economic DailyXinjiang NewspaperYunnan

ZhejiangQianjiang Evening NewsZhejiang DailySpecial administrative regions

Hong KongSee Newspapers of Hong KongMacauSee Media of MacauBusiness news21st Century Business Herald - Southern Media Group publishes this paper Monday to FridayChina Business - business weekly, published by the Chinese Academy of Social SciencesChina Business News - first Chinese business daily, aims "to be the most influential, authoritative and respected financial daily newspaper in ChinaChina Economic Times (Zhongguo Jingji Shibao) - Chinese financial and economic informationChina Financial News - published in 1987, official newspaper of all Chinese major banksChina Stock News - China's leading newspaper for stock market, provides much data for accessChinese Business ViewThe Economic Observer - China's leading weekly for economy, politics, and culture; English edition of the privately owned weekly newspaper International Business Times (HK English)  National Business Daily - publishes eight pages apiece on domestic and international business newsXinhua Business Weekly - an English newsletter published weekly by Xinhua News Agency

Information technology newsChina Information World - published for 20 years; offers all IT information  China PC News - covers Chinese IT news, consumer news, PC services, software and hardware IT Business Information - mainly provides software solutions to both buyers and sellers IT Management - news centre for IT manager, project manager, CIO etc. PC Professional China - computer technical discussion zone newspaper, also offers a buyers' guide  PC World - provides IT resources to enterprise, downloads, IT blog, and other technical journals Programming and Maintenance - covers topics from programming to PC maintenance 

Sports newsOriental Sports Daily - a city newspaper from Shanghai, which focuses on Shanghai and surrounding cities's football eventsSoccer News - dedicated to Chinese soccer fans, reports national and international soccer newsSports China - covers sports news for every sports events, includes Chinese martial artsTitan Sports - China's most successful sports bi-weekly newspaper; it started as a weekly newspaper with focus on world soccer news, then expanded to Chinese soccer news, especially with China's first participation in the final phase of World Cup (2002).  It has conquered and kept more than 80% of printed sports media market-share with its filial magazines such as Soccer Weekly, Golf Digest China, Slam China, Runners' World China, etc.

Defunct newspapersWan guo gong bao - monthly newspaper published by Methodist missionaries from 1868 to 1907Central Daily News'' – published by the Kuomintang from 1928 to 2006.

See also
 List of magazines in China
 History of newspapers and magazines#China
 Chinese tabloid
 Media in the People's Republic of China
 Communications in the People's Republic of China
 List of non-English-language newspapers in New South Wales#Chinese language newspapers

References

External links
Newspapers and news sources from China at Kidon Media Link
Ex People's Daily journalist reveals how the media work in China at lagranepoca.com
Chinese newspapers at Newspapers24.com
China newspapers at onlinenewspapers.com
Chinese newspapers and news sites in English at world-newspapers.com
Chinese newspapers and news sites at w3newspapers.com
World’s 100 Largest Newspapers - World Association of Newspapers
Chinese Newspapers at HK News Power Online
 

 
Newspapers